Biddu is a Palestinian town in the Jerusalem Governorate, located 6 kilometers northwest of Jerusalem in the West Bank. According to the Palestinian Central Bureau of Statistics, the town had a population of 6,368 in 2006. Biddu is at an altitude of 806m to 834m. Giv'on HaHadashah lies 2 km east of Biddu.

Location
It is bordered by Beit Iksa to the east, Beit Ijza to the north, Al Qubeiba to the west, and Beit Surik  to the south.

History
Bagatti suggested that several buildings in the town are from the 12th century. South-west of the centre is the ruined wali of Sheikh Abu Talal, which might have been a Crusader church.

Ottoman era
In the Ottoman tax records of the 1500s, Biddu was located in the nahiya of Jerusalem.

In 1738 Richard Pococke noted the village, as he passed between Biddu and Beit Surik.

In 1838 Edward Robinson noted the village during his travels in the area. It was described as a Muslim  village, located in the Beni Malik area, west of Jerusalem.

In May 1863 Victor Guérin visited the village, called Biddou. He described it as being situated on a very high plateau, with some 150 inhabitants. Some houses seemed very old.

Socin, citing an official Ottoman village list compiled around 1870, noted that  Biddu had 70 houses and a population of  247, though the population count included only men. It was further noted that “the village was once more important, also it has a cistern carved in the rock. The Crusader road from Ramle to Nabi Samwil ran through here.“ Hartmann found that Biddu  had 71 houses.

In 1883 the PEF's Survey of Western Palestine described it as "a village on a rocky hill, with a well to the north east. It is of moderate size."

In 1896 the population of Biddu was estimated to be about 546 persons.

British Mandate era
In the 1922 census of Palestine conducted by the British Mandate authorities, Biddu had a population 252, all Muslims. This had increased in the 1931 census to 399, still all Muslim, in 88 houses.

In the 1945 statistics the population of Biddu consisted of 520 Muslims and the land area was 5,392  dunams, according to an official land and population survey. Of this, 334 dunams were designated for plantations and irrigable land, 2,258 for cereals, while 19 dunams were built-up (urban) areas.

Jordanian era
On the night of 19 April 1948 the village was attacked by the Palmach.  The attacking force was commanded by Yosef Tabenkin, based in Jerusalem. They were later to become the Harel Brigade of the Israeli army. The attack came from Beit Surik which had been captured earlier that night. Biddu was subjected to a short bombardment from a Davidka after which Palmach sappers entered the village and demolished its houses, and effectively stripped it of its inhabitants. Before withdrawing from both Biddu and Beit Surik, under Moshe Dayan's direction, a special unit contaminated the villages' wells with a biological warfare agent consisting of typhus and diphtheria bacteria. The purpose of such poisoning was to make Palestinian villages that had conquered but not yet occupied uninhabitable to residents seeking to return to their homes. 

In the wake of the 1948 Arab–Israeli War, and after the 1949 Armistice Agreements, Biddu came under Jordanian rule from 1948 until 1967.

In 1961, the population of Biddu was  1,444.

Post-1967

Since the Six-Day War in 1967, Biddu  has been under Israeli occupation. The population in the 1967 census conducted by the Israeli authorities was 1,259, of whom 567 originated from Israeli territory.

After the 1995 accords, 24.8% of  Biddu’s land was classified as Area B,   the remaining 75.2% as Area C.

Israel has confiscated about 627 dunams of Biddus land for the Israeli settlement of Har Adar (Giv’at HaRadar), and 186 dunams for Giv’on Ha’hadasha.

Enclave
Biddu along with 9 other Palestinian villages, Beit Duqqu, Beit 'Anan, Beit Surik, Qatanna, al-Qubeiba, Beit Ijza, Kharayib Umm al Lahimand and at Tira form the "Biddu enclave" which, according to Tanya Reinhart, are imprisoned behind a wall, cut off from their orchards and farmlands that are being seized in order to form the real estate reserves of the Jerusalem Corridor and to create a territorial continuity with Giv'at Ze'ev. The enclave will be linked to Ramallah by underpasses and a road that is fenced on both sides. From the "Biddu enclave" Palestinians will travel along a fenced road that passes under a bypass road to Bir Nabala enclave, then on a second underpass under Bypass Road 443 to Ramallah.

In 2004, initially peaceful demonstrations against the separation barrier in Biddu turned violent when the IDF cleared the area. Biddu has become a focal point for non-violent resistance to the process of incorporating Palestinian lands into Israeli settlements.
Biddu villagers promote the use of their bodies to hinder bulldozing of their terrain, and recourse to arms or violence is forbidden.

Attempts to have "women only" protests, to avoid conflict, have met with defeat. In one demonstration by Israeli and local women activists in April 2004, a protest by 70 women brandishing signs and singing was broken up by tear gas, stun grenades, and mounted police. Diaa' A-Din 'Abd al-Karim Ibrahim Abu 'Eid was shot dead by gunfire during an anti-barrier demonstration on 18 April 2004. Muhammad Fadel Hashem Rian and Zakaria Mahmoud 'Eid Salem were shot dead during anti-barrier demonstrations on 26 February 2004 at Beit Ijaz (a satellite village of Biddu).

Footnotes

Bibliography

  
  

 
    (pp. 57-59)

External links
Welcome To Biddu
Survey of Western Palestine, Map 17:    IAA, Wikimedia commons 
West Bank's vulnerable olive growers, Al Jazeera
Biddu Town (Fact Sheet),  Applied Research Institute–Jerusalem (ARIJ)
 Biddu Town Profile, ARIJ
Biddu aerial photo, ARIJ
Locality Development Priorities and Needs in Biddu, ARIJ

 Facebook, Biddu official facebook page

Towns in the West Bank
Jerusalem Governorate
Municipalities of the State of Palestine